Chicaloma is a location in the La Paz Department in Bolivia. It is the seat of the Chicaloma Canton, one of the six cantons of the Irupana Municipality in the Sud Yungas Province. In 2009 it had an estimated population of 783.

References

External links 
 Irupana Municipality: Population data and map

Populated places in La Paz Department (Bolivia)